The  Democracy Party of China (DPC) is a political party that started in the People's Republic of China, and was banned by the Chinese Communist Party (CCP). The history of the DPC and its foundation date is unclear because it has many historical paths under different groups of founders. According to western sources, it is generally recognized to have assembled in 1998 by democracy activists and former student leaders from the 1989 Tiananmen Square protests.

History

Foundation
While the earliest date listed for its founding is 25 June 1998, the group registered the party on 28 June when US President Bill Clinton was visiting China. Wang Youcai, one of the main activists during the 1989 Tiananmen protest along with Wang Donghai and Lin Hui went to the Civil Public Affair Hall of Hangzhou in Zhejiang Province to officially register the party. Their registration was declined.

Communist Party response
The next day on 29 June, Wang was arrested by the state police at his home. He was charged with creating opposition against the Chinese government. His trial began on 18 December, and as he had no lawyer defence, his trial lasted only a few hours. He was quickly sentenced on 21 December to 11 years of imprisonment and three years of deprivation of political rights for subversion.  He was released from prison and exiled in 2004 under international political pressure, especially from the United States.

On the same day, Xu Wenli, a 55-year-old member was also sentenced to 13 years for overthrowing the Communist party. On 24 December 2002, Xu was exiled to America on grounds of medical parole.

On 22 December, Qin Yongmin was sentenced to 12 years in prison for harming state securities.

Li Peng, Chairman of the Standing Committee of the National People's Congress at the time proclaimed, "If a group is designed to negate the leadership of the Communist Party, then it will not be allowed to exist."

The Communist party declared the DPC an illegal organization, followed by a crackdown in Beijing in 1998. After the sentencing on 23 December, the Supreme People's Court then declared that, "anyone who knowingly publishes, prints, copies, or distributes material containing incitement to overthrow state power and the socialist system or split the country" could be tried for crimes. Such charges could result in life sentences for film directors, computer software developers, writers and artists, and media and publishing personnel, all of whom are subject to the directive.

Crackdown on other members
There were hundreds of DPC members who were detained, arrested, and sentenced to prison. Among them:
Liu Xianbin
Wu Yilong
Gao Hongmin
Zha Jianguo
Mao Qinxiang
Zhu Yufu
Zhu Zhengming
Liu Shizhun
She Wanbao
Chen Shuqing
Xie Wanjun

The above are some of the members of the party. Internet dissident He Depu was also arrested and detained in a correctional facility.

Present
Later Xu Wenli and Wang Youcai were exiled to the US on 24 December 2002 and 4 March 2004. On 13 August 2006, the first congress of the DPC was convened in the Sheraton Hotel of Flushing, Queens, New York in the United States. Ni Yu Xian, the leader of China's democracy movement, one of the founders of DPC and the China Freedom & Democracy Party, presided over the congress. A total of 111 delegates from all the provinces, municipalities and autonomous regions of China attended the Congress. The congress passed the Statutes of Democracy Party of China, Party Program, and some important resolutions.

Democracy Party of China Coordinative Service Platform was founded by the members of Democracy Party of China members who are in China, overseas students, and exiled Democracy Party of China members. The initiative group members are Wang Youcai, Lin Hui, Chen Shuqing, Chen Zhiwei, Gao Yeju, Lv Gengsong, Xu Guang, Shan Chenfeng, along with many other members.

In January 2008, party member Zheng Cunzhu established the Local Committee of Democracy Party of China. Zheng Cunzhu is a former student leader during 1989's pre-democratic movements in Anhui province, and he published an open letter to the leaders of China to advocate the restarting of political reform.

Party summary
The DPC suggests the ideas of "Prosperity, Fairness, Democracy" (富裕 公平 民主) and "Freedom, Rule-of-Law, Human rights" (自由 法制 人权/人權). The DPC has four features:

The Chinese Democracy Party was founded in mainland China.
Based on the many documents issued by the Democracy Party of China Zhejiang Organizing Committee and the Beijing-Tianjin Party Office in 1998, especially the “Declaration of the Democracy Party of China for the New Century” issued by Chinese Democracy Party United Headquarter on January 1, 2000, it is clear that the DPC is firmly established on a solid foundation of true democratic ideals.
The Chinese Democracy Party was founded by a large group of people. Its key members are mainly from participants of the 1978 Chinese Democracy Wall Movement, the 1989 Democracy Movement, and various democracy movements from abroad. The vast majority of its leadership was chosen through fair elections. More than 40 of its leaders have endured the suffering of imprisonment. Until today, more than 20 of its leaders are still in prison.
Since the first day of its founding, the Chinese Democracy Party has been receiving close attention and intervention from the government of the United States and other nations. Specifically in 1999 under the leadership of Mr. Wang Xizhe, the United Nations Commission on Human Rights nominated DPC members Xu Wenli, Qin Yongmin and Wang Youcai for the Nobel Peace Prize.

See also
 List of political parties in the People's Republic of China

References

External links

[http://www.cdp.org CDP.org: China Democracy Party' website]
China Democracy Party in California
CDP2008.org: China Democracy Party USA Headquarters
CDP1998.org: China Democratic Party Union
Future China Coordinative Service Platform of China Democracy Party − Chinese Constitutional Democratic Transition Research
Human Rights Watch.org:  Human Rights Chronology: China, Hong Kong, Tibet —  (November–December 1998)''.
Marketwatch.com: "Yahoo hit with second Chinese dissident lawsuit"

1998 establishments in China
Anti-communism in China
Anti-communist parties
Banned political parties in China
Chinese democracy movements
Conservative parties in China
Human rights in China
Liberal conservative parties
Liberal parties in Asia
Organizations based in Beijing
Political parties established in 1998
1989 Tiananmen Square protests and massacre